Venugopal (born 26 August 1961), popularly known as Venu, is an Indian cinematographer and film director who works mainly in Malayalam cinema. An alumnus of the Film and Television Institute of India, Pune and CMS college Kottayam. He has been the recipient of four National Film Awards, including three for Best Cinematography and one Indira Gandhi Award for Best Debut Film of a Director, and four Kerala State Film Awards. He is a founding member of the Indian Society of Cinematographers (ISC).

Personal life

Venu is the grandson of Malayalam author Karur Neelakanta Pillai. Venu is married to Indian film editor Beena Paul since 26 August 1983.The couple has a daughter Malavika who is married to an Englishman and is the Manager of the Great North Museum: Hancock.

Career
Venu graduated from the Film and Television Institute of India, Pune, with a diploma in motion picture photography in 1982. He has worked as cinematographer in over 80 feature films with Mani Kaul, K G George, John Abraham, Buddhadeb Dasgupta, Pamela Rooks, Padmarajan, Bharathan and M. T. Vasudevan Nair.

In 1987, Venu received his first National Film Award (jointly for Amma Ariyan and Namukku Parkkan Munthiri Thoppukal). He went onto receive two more awards for Miss Beatty's Children (1993) and Ponthan Mada (1994). In 1998, he made his directorial debut with Daya, a period fiction written by M. T. Vasudevan Nair. The film won the Kerala State Film Award for Best Debut Director and Indira Gandhi Award for Best Debut Film of a Director. In 2014, he directed his second film, Munnariyippu, starring Mammootty. His latest work is Carbon, starring Fahadh Faasil.

Filmography

As cinematographer

Malayalam

Prem Nazirine Kanmanilla (1983)
Irakal (1985)
Sister Alphonsa of Bharananganam (1986)
Desatanakkili Karayarilla (1986)
Kariyilakkattu Pole (1986)
Arappatta Kettiya Gramathil (1986)
 Pranamam (1986)
Namukku Parkkan Munthiri Thoppukal (1986)
Amma Ariyan (1986)
Kathakku Pinnil (1987)
Aparan (1988)
Moonnam Pakkam (1988)
Dhwani (1988)
Aranyakam (1988)
Vadakkunokkiyantram (1989)
Dasharatham (1989)
Season (1989)
Ramji Rao Speaking (1989)
In Harihar Nagar (1990)
Innale (1990)
Thazhvaram (1990)
Kadavu (1991)
Keli (1991)
Njan Gandharvan (1991)
GodFather (1991)
Vietnam Colony (1992)
Aham (1992)
Nakshthrakoodaram (1992)
Malootty (1992)
Maya Mayooram (1993)
Chenkol (1993)
Oru Kadankatha Pole (1993)
Manichitrathazhu (1993)
Ponthan Mada (1994)
Thacholi Varghese Chekavar (1995)
Sindoora Rekha (1995)
Bhoothakkannadi (1997)
Angene Oru Avadhikkalathu (1999)
Chandamama (1999)
Matrubhoomi: A Nation Without Women (2003)
Margam (2003)
2 Harihar Nagar (2009)
Bhagyadevatha (2009)
In Ghost House Inn (2010)
Kadha Thudarunnu (2010)
Pranchiyettan & the Saint (2010)
Tournament (2011)
Snehaveedu (2011)
Three Kings (2011)
Puthiya Theerangal (2012)
Cobra (2012)
Spirit (2012)
Celluloid (2013)
Munnariyippu (2014)

Hindi
Mati Manas (1984)
Tarpan (1994)
Maharathi (2008)

Bengali
Bagh Bahadur (1989)
Tahader Katha  (1992)
Lal Darja (1997)
Mondo Meyer Upakhyan (2002)
Swapner Din (2004)

Tamil
Guna (1991)
Minsara Kanavu (1997)
Anbe Aaruyire (2005)
Thirumagan (2007)

English
Miss Beatty's Children  (1992)
Taj Mahal: A Monument of Love (2003)

Telugu
Nuvvostanante Nenoddantana (2005)
Pournami (2006)
Jai Chiranjeeva (2005)

As director
Daya (1998)
Munnariyippu (2014)
Carbon (2018)
Aanum Pennum (2021)

References

External links
 

Living people
Malayalam film directors
Film and Television Institute of India alumni
Best Cinematography National Film Award winners
Malayalam film cinematographers
20th-century Indian photographers
21st-century Indian photographers
Film directors from Kerala
20th-century Indian film directors
21st-century Indian film directors
Cinematographers from Kerala
Malayalam screenwriters
Screenwriters from Kerala
Director whose film won the Best Debut Feature Film National Film Award
1961 births